The Military ranks of Zimbabwe are the military insignia used by the Zimbabwe Defence Forces. Zimbabwe is a landlocked country, and does therefore not possess a navy.

Commissioned officer ranks
The rank insignia of commissioned officers.

Other ranks
The rank insignia of non-commissioned officers and enlisted personnel.

References

External links
 

Zimbabwe
Military of Zimbabwe
Zimbabwe and the Commonwealth of Nations